WDBR (103.7 FM) is a commercial radio station licensed to Springfield, Illinois, and serving Central Illinois.  It is owned by Saga Communications and broadcasts a Top 40 (CHR) radio format.

WDBR has an effective radiated power (ERP) of 50,000 watts, the maximum for most FM stations in Illinois.  The transmitter is on South Dirksen Parkway (Illinois Route 29) near East Cook Street.  WDBR broadcasts using HD Radio technology.  It has three digital subchannels, which in turn, feed three FM translators: HD2: 101.1 The Outlaw (classic country), HD3: Pure Oldies 107.5 (oldies) and HD4: Rewind 93.5 (classic hits)

History

Beautiful WTAX-FM
In , the station signed on the air as WTAX-FM.  It was Springfield's second FM station and the oldest continuously operating FM station in the market.  (Currently, a station at 93.9 in Sherman, Illinois uses the WTAX-FM call sign.  It is also owned by Saga Communications.)

In its early years, it largely simulcast its AM sister station, WTAX 1240 AM.  But in the 1960s, it got a separate format: beautiful music.  WTAX-FM played quarter hour sweeps of soft, instrumental cover versions of popular songs, Broadway and Hollywood show tunes.  The station was largely automated.

Oldies and CHR WDBR
In January 1972, WTAX-FM switched to Drake-Chenault's "Solid Gold" automated format, as WDBR.  It was a mix of adult appeal Top 40 hits and rock Oldies. WDBR dropped "Solid Gold" in late 1973 and went to a locally programmed, voicetracked Top 40 sound, which proved successful in the ratings. During the 1970s and 1980s, WDBR was known by the moniker Music 104. 

WDBR remained largely voicetracked until the early 1990s, when increased competition and faltering ratings forced the station, by then owned by Sentry Insurance, to go fully live, after which the station regained its position as a dominant force in Springfield Top 40 radio. The team included: Gregory Lawley, Lisa Crocker, and Patrick Gordon mornings, Bobby T. middays, Jimmy Moore Afternoons, and Ricky Elliott nights with the original "Hot 9 at 9". Rick also hosted the "Dance Machine" on Fox TV affiliate WRSP-TV.

WDBR's tower (shared with sister station WTAX 1240 AM), in operation since 1949, was destroyed by a tornado during the severe weather outbreak of March 2006. The stations soon resumed broadcasting from a new tower at a new location.

HD Radio
On October 2, 2013, Adult Hits ABE FM was moved from 93.9 FM to WDBR-HD2 and also transmitted on 101.1 FM (W266BZ-FM) to create 101.1 ABE FM. On January 29, 2016, 101.1 ABE FM flipped to classic country as "101.1 The Outlaw".  

Additional HD subchannels were added playing 1960s-70s oldies (Pure Oldies 107.5) and 1980s-90s classic hits (Rewind 93.5).

References

External links

Doug Quick's site with extensive history of Top 40 radio in central Illinois, including WDBR

Sangamon County, Illinois
DBR
Contemporary hit radio stations in the United States
Radio stations established in 1949
1949 establishments in Illinois